Glutamyl-tRNA(Gln) amidotransferase, subunit C homolog (bacterial) is a protein that in humans is encoded by the GATC  gene. The gene is also known as 15E1.2 and encodes part of a Glu-tRNA(Gln) amidotransferase enzyme.

Model organisms

Model organisms have been used in the study of GATC function. A conditional knockout mouse line, called Gatctm1a(KOMP)Wtsi was generated as part of the International Knockout Mouse Consortium program — a high-throughput mutagenesis project to generate and distribute animal models of disease to interested scientists — at the Wellcome Trust Sanger Institute.

Male and female animals underwent a standardized phenotypic screen to determine the effects of deletion. Twenty eight tests were carried out on mutant mice and two significant abnormalities were observed. No homozygous mutant embryos were recorded during gestation and, in a separate study, no homozygous animals were observed at weaning. This may imply that double deletion of the GATC gene is lethal to zygotes. The remaining tests were carried out on adult heterozygous mutant animals but no further abnormalities were seen.

References

Further reading 
 

Human proteins
Genes mutated in mice